Same-sex marriage in Connecticut has been legally recognized since November 12, 2008, following a state court decision that found the state's civil unions failed to provide same-sex couples with rights and privileges equivalent to those of marriage. Connecticut was the second U.S. state to legalize same-sex marriage, after neighboring Massachusetts.

Civil unions
The state enacted a civil union law in 2005 that provided same-sex couples with the same rights and responsibilities under state law as marriage, while also explicitly defining marriage as between one man and one woman. Connecticut became the second state in the United States, following Vermont, to adopt civil unions, and the first to do so without judicial intervention. The bill was passed by the House of Representatives on April 13 in a 85–63 vote and by the Senate on April 20 in a 26–8 vote. Governor Jodi Rell signed the bill into law later the same day, and it went into effect on October 1, 2005.

Prior to the passage of the civil union legislation, Connecticut had recognized same-sex relationships solely for the purpose of providing benefits to same-sex partners of state employees.

Following the Supreme Court of Connecticut's October 2008 ruling which found that civil unions failed to provide same-sex couples with the rights and responsibilities of marriage, all existing civil unions were automatically transformed into marriages on October 1, 2010.

Same-sex marriage

Statute

On January 31, 2007, State Senator Andrew J. McDonald and State Representative Michael Lawlor, co-chairpersons of the Judiciary Committee, announced the introduction of a bill that would give same-sex couples full marriage rights in the state of Connecticut. The bill, HB 7395, passed the Judiciary Committee by a vote of 27–15 on April 12, 2007. Governor Jodi Rell said she would veto any same-sex marriage legislation. The bill was never submitted to the full House or Senate prior to the adjournment of the 2007 legislative session.

On April 22, 2009, Connecticut legislators, both in the House (by a 100–44 vote) and in the Senate (by a 28–7 vote), agreed to replace all statutory references to marriage with gender-neutral language. Governor Jodi Rell, a Republican, signed the law on April 23. The definition of marriage in Connecticut is now the following:

On October 1, 2010, civil unions ceased to be performed, and existing civil unions were automatically converted into marriages. Before that date, couples in existing Connecticut civil unions could convert them to marriages voluntarily. Same-sex marriages, civil unions and domestic partnerships from other jurisdictions are legally treated as marriages in Connecticut.

Lawsuits

Kerrigan v. Commissioner of Public Health

In August 2004, Gay & Lesbian Advocates & Defenders (GLAD) representing eight same-sex couples from Connecticut filed a lawsuit in state court, challenging what they described as the state's discriminatory exclusion of same-sex couples from the right to marry. The couples, seven of whom had been denied marriage licenses in Madison, sued the Connecticut Department of Public Health and the Madison registrar of vital statistics, Dorothy Dean. They argued that this discrimination violated the equality and liberty provisions of the Constitution of Connecticut and were supported by the Connecticut Civil Liberties Union. The case was opposed by the Family Institute of Connecticut, which was denied intervenor status in the case.

On July 12, 2006, a Superior Court judge ruled against the plaintiffs, finding that:
 
The judge concluded that denying same-sex couples the right to marry did not violate the Connecticut Constitution. The Supreme Court of Connecticut heard an appeal by the plaintiffs in Kerrigan v. Commissioner of Public Health on May 14, 2007. On October 10, 2008, the court released an opinion guaranteeing marriage rights to same-sex couples. The court ruled 4–3 that denying same-sex couples the right to marry violated the equality and liberty provisions of the Constitution of Connecticut. The court also held that it would be unconstitutional to relegate same-sex couples to a status less than full marriage by enacting legislation treating same-sex unions as civil unions rather than marriage:

On November 12, 2008, the first marriage licenses were issued to same-sex couples in Connecticut. Among the first couples to obtain marriage licenses were plaintiffs in the Kerrigan case, Robin and Barbara Levine-Ritterman in New Haven, and Elizabeth Kerrigan and Joanne Mock-Kerrigan in West Hartford. The court decision made Connecticut the third U.S. state to recognize same-sex marriage, but by the time the first same-sex marriages were solemnized in Connecticut, California voters had approved a same-sex marriage ban by referendum. Governor Rell reacted to the ruling by issuing the statement: "The Supreme Court has spoken. I do not believe their voice reflects the majority of the people of Connecticut. However, I am also firmly convinced that attempts to reverse this decision - either legislatively or by amending the state Constitution - will not meet with success." State Senator Donald E. Williams Jr. called it a "civil rights victory".

Before the court issued its decision, a coalition of groups that included such opponents of same-sex marriage as the state's Roman Catholic bishops and the Family Institute of Connecticut supported a November referendum on a proposal to convene a constitutional convention. On November 4, 2008, voters opposed calling a constitution convention by a 2 to 1 margin.

Mueller v. Tepler
On July 16, 2014, the Connecticut Supreme Court, reversing judgments in lower courts, ruled unanimously that a same-sex couple in a relationship established before the state afforded legal recognition to their relationship has the same rights as other married couples. In the case of Mueller v. Tepler, it allowed a woman to pursue a medical practice claim for the loss of income and companionship based on the care her female partner received between 2001 and 2004.

Native American nations
Same-sex marriage has been legal on the reservation of the Mashantucket Pequot Tribe since April 29, 2010. The Tribal Code states that "two persons may be joined in marriage" provided the parties are of marriageable age and meet all the legal requirements to marry. Marriages entered into outside the tribe's jurisdiction are valid if they are valid in the jurisdiction where they were entered into. Marriages performed under native Pequot custom, known as
, are also recognized on the reservation.

Demographics and marriage statistics
Data from the 2000 U.S. census showed that 7,386 same-sex couples were living in Connecticut. By 2005, this had increased to 10,174 couples, likely attributed to same-sex couples' growing willingness to disclose their partnerships on government surveys. Same-sex couples lived in all counties of the state, and constituted 1.1% of coupled households and 0.6% of all households in the state. Most couples lived in Hartford, Fairfield and New Haven counties, but the counties with the highest percentage of same-sex couples were Litchfield (0.60% of all county households) and Hartford (0.59%). Same-sex partners in Connecticut were on average younger than opposite-sex partners, and more likely to be employed. In addition, the median household income of same-sex couples was higher than different-sex couples, but same-sex couples were far less likely to own a home than opposite-sex partners. 19% of same-sex couples in Connecticut were raising children under the age of 18, with an estimated 3,140 children living in households headed by same-sex couples in 2005.

From 2009 to 2019, 12,704 same-sex marriages were performed in the state of Connecticut: 543 in 2008, 2,706 in 2009, 1,791 in 2010, 1,262 in 2011, 668 in 2012, 1,356 in 2013, 1,057 in 2014, 689 in 2015, 704 in 2016, 672 in 2017, 639 in 2018, and 617 in 2019. The Connecticut Department of Public Health has included the towns and counties of occurrence for same-sex marriages in their annual vital statistics report since 2016, as shown below:

Public opinion
{| class="wikitable"
|+style="font-size:100%" | Public opinion for same-sex marriage in Connecticut
|-
! style="width:190px;"| Poll source
! style="width:200px;"| Date(s)administered
! class=small | Samplesize
! Margin oferror
! style="width:100px;"| % support
! style="width:100px;"| % opposition
! style="width:40px;"| % no opinion
|-
| Public Religion Research Institute
| align=center| March 8–November 9, 2021
| align=center| ?
| align=center| ?
|  align=center| 77%
| align=center| 21%
| align=center| 1%
|-
| Public Religion Research Institute
| align=center| April 5–December 23, 2017
| align=center| 659 random telephoneinterviewees
| align=center| ?
|  align=center| 73%
| align=center| 20%
| align=center| 7%
|-
| Public Religion Research Institute
| align=center| May 18, 2016–January 10, 2017
| align=center| 1,073 random telephoneinterviewees
| align=center| ?
|  align=center| 70%
| align=center| 20%
| align=center| 10%
|-
| Public Religion Research Institute
| align=center| April 29, 2015–January 7, 2016
| align=center| 872 random telephone interviewees
| align=center| ?
|  align=center| 70%
| align=center| 24%
| align=center| 7%
|-
|-
|align| New York Times/CBS News/YouGov
| align=center| September 20–October 1, 2014
| align=center| 1,284 likely voters
| align=center| ± 3.3%
|  align=center| 61%
| align=center| 26%
| align=center| 13%
|-
| Public Religion Research Institute
| align=center| April 2, 2014–January 4, 2015
| align=center| 565 random telephone interviewees
| align=center| ?
|  align=center| 67%
| align=center| 26%
| align=center| 7%
|-
| Public Policy Polling
| align=center| July 26–29, 2012
| align=center| 771 voters
| align=center| ± 3.53%
|  align=center| 55%
| align=center| 33%
| align=center| 12%
|-
| Public Policy Polling
| align=center| September 22–25, 2011
| align=center| 592 voters
| align=center| ± 4%
|  align=center| 55%
| align=center| 32%
| align=center| 13%
|-
| Quinnipiac University Polling Institute
| align=center| March 29–April 4, 2005
| align=center| 1,541 registered voters
| align=center| ± 2.5%
| align=center| 42%
|  align=center| 53%
| align=center| 6%
|-
| Quinnipiac University Polling Institute
| align=center| May 26–June 1, 2004
| align=center| 1,350 registered voters
| align=center| ± 2.7%
| align=center| 45%
|  align=center| 50%
| align=center| 5%
|-
| Quinnipiac University Polling Institute
| align=center| October 1–7, 2003
| align=center| 1,519 voters
| align=center| ± 2.5%
| align=center| 44%
|  align=center| 50%
| align=center| 6%
|-

See also
 LGBT rights in Connecticut
 Same-sex marriage in the United States
 Same-sex marriage legislation in the United States
 Same-sex marriage law in the United States by state
 Public opinion of same-sex marriage in the United States
 Same-sex marriage status in the United States by state
 Rights and responsibilities of marriages in the United States
 History of civil marriage in the United States

References

2008 in LGBT history
Connecticut
LGBT rights in Connecticut
2008 in Connecticut